Naval Consolidated Brig may refer to:

Naval Consolidated Brig, Chesapeake in Chesapeake, Virginia
Naval Consolidated Brig, Charleston in Hanahan, South Carolina
Naval Consolidated Brig, Miramar in San Diego, California